Kouka is a small village in the Limassol District of Cyprus, in the foothills of the Troodos Mountains on the western slopes of the Kouris Valley. The village is 2 km south of Pera Pedi on the road to Sylikou, and it is home to the church of Timios Stavros (Holy Cross).

Kouka Village and its History

The village is located 25 km from Limassol and only a few minutes from Platres and the Troodos mountains. Kouka is in the middle of the villages of Koilani, Pera Pedi, Sylikou, Moniatis, Saittas and Trimiklini.

It is included among the wine producing villages of Limassol District and it is surrounded by vines, pine trees and oak trees, some of which are over 100 years old.

The tradition of the village goes back through the centuries, as it is famous for the Timios Stavros Monastery, founded during the years of Saint Helena, the mother of Constantine the Great, who visited the island in the year 327 AD. The most important chroniclers and historians of Cyprus, Leontios Machairas, Georgios Boustronios and Archimandrite Kyprianos, document the Monastery and the Holy Cross of the church, on which were kept pieces from the Holy Wood that Saint Helena gave as a present to the village.

Kouka derives its name from the word "Koka", the type of hair of a noble man who had most of the village as his property, probably during the Venetian period in Cyprus.

References

Vasyl Bars’kyj, who travelled extensively in the region in the early eighteenth-century, maintained a travel journal that was published after his death in 1747. Extracts from this journal were published in 1996 by the Greece and Cyprus Research Centre (Volume III) as A Pilgrim’s Account of Cyprus: Bars’kyj’s Travels in Cyprus. In this he writes about walking from Koilani via present day Agia Mavri to Kouka:

“Once again I crossed the stream at the ford and walked through the neighbouring mountains for an hour and arrived at the monastery of the True Cross, called Kouka, named after the village in which it is found. When I visited the village it was deserted, with only one or two houses. This small monastery, like the previous one of Saint Maura of which I have spoken, is under the jurisdiction of the Bishop of Kition. Originally there was no monastery, only a village church. When the village was abandoned and the church stood empty, a hieromonk with novices settled there to look after the place, and on his death another one and then another, and so the replaced one another until the present day, feeding themselves from their own labours in agriculture.” (A hieromonk is a monk who is also a priest – monks in the Orthodox Church are not automatically priests)

Rev J Hackett in The Church of Cyprus published in 1900 wrote: “In the village church of Kouka near Kilani was deposited the dust from the suppedaneum of the Cross, when it was sawn in pieces by Helena’s orders” (The suppedaneum is a support for feet on a cross for crucifixion)

George Jeffrey in A Description of the Historic Monuments of Cyprus published in 1918, noted the following: “Kouka is a Moslem hamlet but at its centre stands an interesting little church of some antiquity associated with the legend of the Holy Cross. The building is cruciform in plan with a dome over the transepts, but of no architectural character. On the north side of the sanctuary is a small square chamber, intended probably as the relic treasury. Within a recess of the wall of the south transept there is also a large cross of wood reclining against the wall exactly like the one on Stavrovouni.”

Rupert Gunnis in Historic Cyprus, published in 1936 made the following entry for Kouka: “The Church of the Holy Cross is a cruciform Byzantine building with a dome over the transept. On the north side is a small square chamber probably built to contain the famous relic of the church, the dust from the suppedaneum of the Cross, when it was sawn in pieces by the order of St Helena. There are considerable remains of painting on the roof and walls of the north transept. There is an unusual seventeenth-century icon of the B.V.M., with a bronze medallion of the Virgin and Child in the centre. The ruins of the monastic buildings still surround the church.”

Jack C. Goodwin in A Historical Toponymy of Cyprus (3rd Edition) published in limited edition in 1978, has the following entry for Kouka: “KOUKA* (LIM XLVII). VILLAGE of the S Troodos Range & 3m SE of Pano Platres. Pop 63(G). Rated 4 in 1977. Elev 740. HZ B6 & C2. PO. In Greek the literal meaning of Koukas is "one who braids his hair", but the village was supposedly named after a certain Kokas who footed the bill for construction of Stavros Ch. The village dates from the 4-8th Cent AD. Less than 50 lived here a century ago; it was a mixed village at that time, there being 2 separate building compounds & a mosque next to one of them. The old Troodos Military Road (separate entry) passed immediately E of the village; it was abandoned long ago in this sector."

References 

Communities in Limassol District